Vidhan Karki (Nepali: बिधान कार्की) who began his musical career in 2012 AD, is now a director of Nepali films and music videos. He has been actively involved in directing Nepali videos for over a decade and has completed a two-year course in film-making from the United States of America. After returning to Nepal, he has been recognized as a music video director and has directed more than 100 music videos along with short films, documentaries, and some television commercials for Nepali radio and television.

About & Biography 
Vidhan Karki is the director of Nepali Films and music videos. His career includes popular songs such as Naboli Naboli, Kale Keta 2, Keto Ali Kamaune Hos, Yesto Maya, and Mero Desh. Samjhanalai Jaali Rumal was the first video he directed. He has also worked on short films and music videos, produced and directed TV commercials and national television shows. Director Karki has directed critically acclaimed short films such as Jeevan Joban Sagun, Garibi, Jab Application, Radhika, Chhaupadi, Sapna, Daijo, and Prem Katha. He is the President of Music Video Directors Guild of Nepal and an advisor of Film Development Board, Nepal. He has received many awards.

Awards

References 

Living people
1988 births
Directors
Living people